Sherman Township is a civil township of Keweenaw County in the U.S. state of Michigan.  The population was 76 at the 2020 census, which ranks it as the fourth-least populated municipality in the state after Pointe Aux Barques Township, Grand Island Township, and West Branch Township.

Communities 
Also spelled as Hebard, the community was settled as a railway station along the Mineral Range Railroad in 1903, and a now-defunct post office opened on June 30, 1903. It was named for lumberman Charles and Edward Hebard. 

Geography

Demographics
As of the census of 2000, there were 60 people, 34 households, and 14 families residing in the township. The population density was 0.9 per square mile (0.4/km). There were 113 housing units at an average density of 1.7 per square mile (0.7/km). The racial makeup of the township was 98.33% White, and 1.67% from two or more races. 46.2% were of Finnish, 11.5% Irish, 7.7% French, 5.8% Dutch, 5.8% German, 5.8% Polish, 5.8% Scandinavian, and 5.8% Slavic ancestry.

There were 34 households, out of which 11.8% had children under the age of 18 living with them, 32.4% were married couples living together, 8.8% had a female householder with no husband present, and 58.8% were non-families. 58.8% of all households were made up of individuals, and 29.4% had someone living alone who was 65 years of age or older. The average household size was 1.76 and the average family size was 2.79.

In the township the population was spread out, with 15.0% under the age of 18, 1.7% from 18 to 24, 20.0% from 25 to 44, 30.0% from 45 to 64, and 33.3% who were 65 years of age or older. The median age was 52 years. For every 100 females, there were 122.2 males. For every 100 females age 18 and over, there were 112.5 males.

The median income for a household in the township was $27,000, and the median income for a family was $45,833. Males had a median income of $26,250 versus $0 for females. The per capita income for the township was $17,989. There were no families and 12.7% of the population living below the poverty line, including no individuals under eighteen and 23.8% of those over 64.

Images

References

Townships in Michigan
Townships in Keweenaw County, Michigan
Houghton micropolitan area, Michigan
Michigan populated places on Lake Superior
Populated places established in 1861
1861 establishments in Michigan